is a dungeon crawler-role playing video game, developed in 2014 by Experience Inc. and published by MAGES and 5pb.Games in Japan and NIS America in Europe and North America. The game was released on PlayStation Vita featuring compatibility with PlayStation TV in July 2014 and was released worldwide for Microsoft Windows in March 2017.

Release
During its launch week in Japan, the game sold 15,242 copies, placing it 5th on the weekly sales charts. A week later it would ship an additional 4,403 units, making the total amount sold after 2 weeks 19,645.

A limited edition launched alongside the game, exclusively on NIS America's online store. It included a collectible box, art book, and soundtrack CD. Alternatively, launch editions came bundled with a copy of the game's soundtrack.

Reception

Operation Abyss: New Tokyo Legacy received mixed reviews from critics, scoring 67/100 on Metacritic (20 reviews), and 66.52% on GameRankings (21 reviews).

Bradly Storm of Hardcore Gamer gave the game a 3.5 out of 5 saying "Operation Abyss: New Tokyo Legacy is a fine DRPG. It has all the facets one would expect from a game of its genre and manages to implement those features effectively." Chris Carter from Destructoid rated the game a 7.5/10 saying, "While I probably won't be rushing to complete it again anytime soon, it was a lengthy enough adventure that will stay fresh in my mind for some time."

Sequel
A sequel called "Operation Babel: New Tokyo Legacy" was released in May 2017.

References

2014 video games
First-person party-based dungeon crawler video games
PlayStation Vita games
Role-playing video games
Video games developed in Japan
Video games set in Tokyo
Nippon Ichi Software games
Windows games